Boldoriella is a genus of beetles in the family Carabidae, containing the following species:

 Boldoriella binaghii Bucciarelli, 1978
 Boldoriella brembana Binaghi, 1937
 Boldoriella carminatii Dodero, 1917
 Boldoriella chiarae Monguzzi, 1982
 Boldoriella concii Monguzzi, 1982
 Boldoriella focarilei (R. Rossi, 1965)
 Boldoriella gratiae Bucciarelli, 1978
 Boldoriella grignensis Monzini, 1987
 Boldoriella humeralis Dodero, 1924
 Boldoriella knauthi (Ganglbauer, 1904)
 Boldoriella manzoniana Monzini, 1995
 Boldoriella monguzzii Bucciarelli, 1978
 Boldoriella pesarinii Sciaky, 1982
 Boldoriella pozziae B. Bani, 1957
 Boldoriella serianensis Breit, 1913
 Boldoriella tedeschii (Sciaky, 1977)

References

Trechinae